The 2022 United States House of Representatives elections in Kansas were held on November 8, 2022, to elect the four U.S. representatives from the state of Kansas, one from each of the state's four congressional districts. The elections coincided with other elections to the House of Representatives, elections to the United States Senate and various state and local elections.

Overview

District 1

The 1st district encompasses much of rural western and northern Kansas, as well as much of the city of Lawrence. Other cities in the district include Manhattan, Salina, Dodge City,  Garden City, Hays and Hutchinson. The incumbent is Republican Tracey Mann, who was elected with 71.2% of the vote in the previous version of this district in 2020.

Republican primary

Candidates

Nominee
Tracey Mann, incumbent U.S. Representative

Endorsements

Results

Democratic primary

Candidates

Nominee
Jimmy Beard, teacher

Results

General election

Predictions

Results

District 2

The 2nd district stretches across much of eastern Kansas from Nebraska to Oklahoma, including the cities of Topeka, Emporia, Junction City and Pittsburg, as well as portions of Kansas City and Lawrence. The incumbent is Republican Jake LaTurner, who was elected with 55.2% of the vote in previous version of this district in 2020.

Republican primary

Candidates

Nominee
Jake LaTurner, incumbent U.S. Representative

Results

Democratic primary

Candidates

Nominee
Patrick Schmidt, retired U.S. Navy officer

Results

General election

Predictions

Polling

Results

District 3

The 3rd district encompasses much of the Kansas City metropolitan area, including a portion of Kansas City, all of Johnson County, and several rural counties to the south and west. Incumbent Democrat Sharice Davids was reelected.

Democratic primary

Candidates

Nominee
Sharice Davids, incumbent U.S. Representative

Endorsements

Results

Republican primary

Candidates

Nominee
Amanda Adkins, former chair of the Kansas Republican Party and nominee for this district in 2020

Eliminated in primary
John McCaughrean, former Army Intelligence analyst

Endorsements

Results

Libertarian convention

Candidates

Nominee
Steven Hohe, nominee for this district in 2016 and 2020

General election

Predictions

Polling

Results

District 4

The 4th district is located in south-central Kansas, taking in Wichita and the surrounding suburbs, including Derby and Newton, as well as rural neighboring areas. The incumbent is Republican Ron Estes, who was reelected with 63.7% of the vote in the previous version of this district in 2020.

Republican primary

Candidates

Nominee
Ron Estes, incumbent U.S. Representative

Results

Democratic primary

Candidates

Nominee
Bob Hernandez, U.S. Army veteran

Results

General election

Predictions

Results

See also 
 2022 Kansas elections

Notes

Partisan clients

References

External links
Official campaign websites for 1st district candidates
Jimmy Beard (D) for Congress
Tracey Mann (R) for Congress

Official campaign websites for 2nd district candidates
Jake LaTurner (R) for Congress
 Patrick Schmidt (D) for Congress

Official campaign websites for 3rd district candidates
Amanda Adkins (R) for Congress
Sharice Davids (D) for Congress

Official campaign websites for 4th district candidates
Ron Estes (R) for Congress
Bob Hernandez (D) for Congress

2022
Kansas
United States House of Representatives